Liparis tunicatus, or the kelp snailfish, is a species of snailfish from the genus Liparis. The kelp snailfish lives in the Arctic and Northwest Atlantic Ocean among kelp. The species is common, at least around Greenland and Franz Josef Land. A bottom feeder, it eats small crustaceans.

The kelp snailfish is among the northernmost living species in its family, together with species like Liparis bathyarcticus and L. fabricii.

Description
It has small dark spots and can have pale stripes. Liparis tunicatus has a small gill opening. It is sometimes confused with juveniles of the related L. gibbus.

References

Liparis (fish)
Fish of the Arctic Ocean
Fish of the Atlantic Ocean
Taxa named by Johan Reinhardt
Fish described in 1836